Marius Mocanu (born 9 December 1986) is a Romanian handballer who plays for CSM Fagaras and the Romania national team.

Achievements 
Liga Națională: 
Winner: 2010, 2011, 2016, 2017, 2018
The Romanian Cup 2017
The Supercup 2017
Bronze 2015
Silver 2019

Individual awards 
All-Star Pivot of the Liga Națională: 2017, 2018

References

    
1986 births
Living people 
People from Călărași
Romanian male handball players 
HC Dobrogea Sud Constanța players
CS Dinamo București (men's handball) players